Can Tho Football Club, simply known as Can Tho, is a professional Vietnamese football club, based in the city of Cần Thơ. Founded in 1976, the club currently competes in the V.League 2.

Season-by-season record

Honours

National competitions
League
V.League 2:
Third place: 2009, 2014
Second League:
Winners: 2001

Kit suppliers and shirt sponsors

Current squad

Managers
 Vương Tiến Dũng (2001–01), (2013–1?)
 Vũ Quang Bảo (2015–17)
 Đinh Hồng Vinh (2017–18)
 Nguyễn Thanh Danh (2019)
 Nguyễn Hữu Đang (2020)
 Nguyễn Liêm Thanh (2021)
 Nguyễn Việt Thắng (2022)
  Hoang Hai Duong (2022–)

References

External links

Football clubs in Vietnam
1980 establishments in Vietnam
Association football clubs established in 1980